Miss Nepal is a national beauty pageant in Nepal. The winners are sent to  Miss World, Miss Earth, Miss International, Miss Supranational.

History
Ever since the pageant started from 1994, historically the winner of the Miss Nepal pageant represented the Nepal in the Miss Asia Pacific. 
After 1997, the Hidden Treasures collaborated with Kathmandu Jaycees and formed two pageants of Kathmandu Jacyees Miss Nepal and Hidden Treasures Miss World Nepal. From 1998 onwards, the winner of Miss Nepal has been sent to Miss World contest and the 1st runner up to Miss Asia Pacific. No contest was held in 2001 because of the Nepalese royal massacre.

From 2004, the 2nd runner up has been granted to represent Nepal in the pageant Miss Earth but it changed a year later, to 1st runner up as it had been stopped sending to Miss Asia Pacific. In 2010, the 2nd runner up has started to send to Miss International. Since 2011 onwards; the names of the 3rd runner up and 4th runner up were revealed while announcing the names of the winners on the Coronation Night. In 2017, Hidden Treasure acquired Miss Universe franchise and crowned Nagma Shrestha as the 1st Miss Universe Nepal 2017. Since 2018 onwards, all 4 winners are of equal position with no runner ups.

As the press announcement of Miss Nepal 2020 by The Hidden treasure Miss Nepal 2020 will air live on Kantipur TV and this is the 1st time Miss Nepal will telecast on another national television after dropping contract with Nepal Television .Beside that The hidden treasure announced that Miss Universe franchise is no more with them so there will have only 4 winners for this years . The price money has been increased from NRS 100000 to NRS 250000 each to all 4 ladies. 
As of the news from the organizer on 20 March 2020, the contest has been postponed due to novel coronavirus (COVID-19), as informed by Chairman of Hidden Treasure Mr. Driwakar Rajkarnikar. More information is to be given on 30 April 2020 regarding the Miss Nepal 2020 contest.

Competition
Since 1994, every year women from age range of 19–24 years old compete on the national pageant of Miss Nepal. In which, 25 contestants are wisely chosen from across the country and they begin a one-month training & grooming course before the final event in which they participate in lectures, social work, photoshoots, interviews and etiquette lessons. On the coronation night, which lasts up to three hours long, all the candidates engage in an opening sequence, introduction speech (after which the top 14 semi-finalists are chosen who then compete in an interview portion with the judges), and an evening gown sequence, where the 7 finalists are chosen. This is when the final common question and answer round is held. At the end, the names of 5 winner are announced from live telecast in Nepal Television.

Tasks
 Miss Nepal's have to represent Nepal into their respective international beauty pageants.
 Miss Nepal gets to be a Young Conservation Ambassador for the activities of WWF Nepal
 Relevant and important charity work with Maiti Nepal & HIV & Aids Campaign.

Requirements
Requirements for selection of participants of the hidden treasure, Miss Nepal:

 The applicant should be an unmarried female Nepalese citizen.
 Age should be between 18 and 27 years.
 Minimum academic qualification should be 10+2 or equivalent.
 Minimum height must be 5 ft 3 inches (160 cm).
 Applicant should possess sound health.
 No tattoo on body.

Notable winners and contestants
Ruby Rana (Miss Nepal 1994)
Neelima Gurung (Miss Nepal 1997)
Niru Shrestha Gurung (Miss Nepal 1998)
Malvika Subba (Miss Nepal 2002)
Anita Gurung (Miss Nepal Earth 2004)
Sarah Gurung (Miss Nepal Asia Pacific 2005)
Anupama Aura Gurung (Miss Nepal Earth 2011)
Shristi Shrestha (Miss Nepal World 2012)
Ishani Shrestha (Miss Nepal World 2013)
Shrinkhala Khatiwada (Miss Nepal World 2018)
Priya Sigdel (Miss Nepal Earth 2018)
Manita Devkota (Miss Nepal Universe 2018)
Anushka Shrestha (Miss Nepal World 2019)
Namrata Shrestha (Miss Nepal World 2020)

Controversial contestants
 1998 Winner Jyoti Pradhan was dethroned when it was discovered that she had fled to the US after she finish competed in Miss World 1998. Therefore, 1st runner-up Niru Shrestha was crowned first place. 
 2012 Contestant Rashmita Maharjan was injured during the scooter practice, resulting her to quit the contest. She later, came back in 2014 contest and made it to Top 10 semi-finalist.
 2014 Contestant Mona Bajracharya's family was unhappy with her competing in the pageant which resulted with her quitting from the contest which give an odd number, from 20 to 19 contestants.
 2014 First Runner-up Prinsha Shrestha was the second Miss Nepal to be dethroned due to breaking the rules from her contract with Hidden Treasure by competing in Miss Eco Queens 2015 pageant. 2nd runner up Sonie Rajbhandari was then given the title of Miss Nepal Earth 2014 (1st runner up)

Winners' gallery

State titles 
There is an unofficial formula to determine the states and regions represented in Nepal. The base number of contestants over the last decade has been 19–20, which can be increased or decreased by pageant's management.

Official states (20)

  * Denotes that state has a preliminary pageant – which may or may not still be held – as of 2014 only Biratnagar, Chitwan, Dharan, Itahari, Jhapa and Pokhara held preliminaries.

  ** Denotes that state has been represented through the Miss Purwanchal (Miss Eastern Region) preliminary. Additionally, two states, Chitwan and Pokhara hold their own individual pageants.

Official regions (5)
Kathmandu Valley ((Nepali: काठमाडौं उपत्यका, Nepal Bhasa: स्वनिगः) Capital valley of Nepal includes Bhaktapur, Kathmandu, Kirtipur and Lalitpur.)
Chitwan Valley ((Nepali: चितवन उपत्यका) Southwestern valley of Nepal includes Chitwan, Makwanpur and Nawalparasi.)
Pokhara Valley ((Nepali: पोखरा उपत्यका) Western valley of Nepal includes Pokhara and Lekhnath.)
Eastern Region ((Nepali: पुर्वाञ्चल विकास क्षेत्र) Eastern Region of Nepal includes Biratnagar, Dharan, Itahari and Jhapa.)
Far-Western Region ((Nepali: सुदुर पश्चिमाञ्चल विकास क्षेत्र) Far Western Region of Nepal includes Dhangadhi and Mahendranagar, Dadeldhura, Baitadi, Bajhang, Darchula, Doti, Achham.)

Biratnagar, Dharan, Itahari and Jhapa are regions of Eastern Region and are titles handed out at the Miss Purwanchal preliminary. As of 1995 Pokhara has its own preliminary.

Together, these 20 regions form the "base" of the Miss Nepal contest. However, at times other regions and territories have been represented. However, many times the pageant has been criticized for having lack of diversity interns of selection of candidates. Due to the reason that many girls from Kathmandu Valley are represented and are consistent in the pageant per year which resulted in the most winners from the Kathmandu Valley. However, since 2013, the pageant has decided to include more candidates from outside the Capital Valley.

International franchise titles 
Miss Nepal sends delegates to participate in the Big Four international beauty pageants including 2 minor international pageants. Note that the year designates the time Nepal has acquired that particular pageant franchise.

Current franchise

Big Five international beauty pageants:
 Miss World (1997–present)
 Miss Earth (2002–present)
 Miss International (2000, 2005, reacquired in 2010–present)
 Miss Universe (2017–2019) (The contest now under a different franchise headed By Nagma Shrestha)
 Miss Supranational (2018–present)

Minor international beauty pageants:

 Miss Asia Pacific International (1994–present)

Representatives at Big Four pageants

The following women have represented Nepal in the Big Four international beauty pageants, the four major international beauty pageants for women. These are Miss World, Miss Universe, Miss International and Miss Earth.

Miss Universe Nepal

Miss Nepal has started to send a Miss Nepal to Miss Universe from 2017. In that year Nagma Shrestha was appointed by Miss Nepal Organization as the first Miss Nepal Universe in the special occasion of 23rd Anniversary of Miss Nepal, Hidden Treasure.

In 2020 the new org. called Miss Universe Nepal independently debuted to select the winner to the Miss Universe pageant. This organization is in under Nagma Shrestha directorship ("Ma Nepali") and CG Corp Global. On occasion, when the winner does not qualify (due to age) for either contest, a runner-up is sent.

Miss Nepal World

After the local franchise for the Miss World pageant in 1997, Miss Nepal have started to send its winner. In 2002, the pageant was held in December which was after the Miss World 2002, hence the Miss Nepal 2002 winner, Malvika Subba missed the opportunity to represent Nepal in the Miss World pageant. On occasion, when the winner does not qualify (due to age) for either contest, a runner-up is sent.

Miss Nepal Earth

Miss Nepal International

Before 2010, Miss Nepal International was organised by different company which produced winners that were represented in Miss International beauty pageant. But since 2010, Hidden Treasure bought the franchise to Miss International and now sends delegate from the annual Miss Nepal beauty pageant.

Minor pageants representatives

Miss Nepal Supranational

Miss Nepal Asia Pacific

From 1994 to 1997, the Miss Nepal pageant was held to select the representative of the Nepal to the Miss Asia Pacific Pageant. In 1997, Jharana Bajracharya was crowned as Hidden Treasures Miss World Nepal 1997 winner who was sent to Miss World 1997 and Kathmandu Jaycees Miss Nepal where Neelima Gurung took the crown and went to Miss Asia Pacific 1997. After 1997, Miss Nepal Beauty Pageant started to hold the local franchise for the Miss World Pageant and the 1st runner up was sent to the Miss Asia Pacific contest until 2004.

Other pageants

Miss Nepal US
The first ever Miss Nepal USA was held, in August 2011 and was organized by Event Planet Inc. For more details about Miss Nepal US, please visit www.misnepalus.com

The aim of this pageant platform is to identify young women leaders who can uphold Nepalese pride in an international platform while advancing her career in the field she is passionate about. Since 2014, there has been introduction to new special awards of Miss California Nepal, Miss New York Nepal and Miss Texas Nepal as the winners of regional states which were equivalent to 3rd runner-up spots. Since 2019, the Miss Nepal US Organisation stopped giving the special regional awards.

Miss Hong Kong Nepal
Miss Nepal Hong Kong started to be held since 1998 in favour of giving a platform for Nepalese teenagers to women in Hong Kong to build up their confidence and self-esteem. Factually, since Hong Kong's life is hectic and also because of internal issues, Miss. Nepal Hong Kong have been ups and downs: 1998 (was held), 1999 (canceled), 2000 (was held), 2001 (was held), 2002, 2003, 2004 (canceled), 2005 (was held). Consequently, Miss Talent Hunt Hong Kong Nepal (Mega Model) was replaced for Miss. Nepal Hong Kong from 2006 to 2009 organized by Laxmi Rai (Lara),  Mamita Gurung (Miss Hong Kong Nepal 2000), Tara Subbha and followed up organizers from 2008 (Basanti Pun and Sushmita Gurung) because of some internal issues. However, from 2010 since Miss Talent Hunt HK Nepal was transformed into an international pageant, it withdrew itself from Miss. Nepal Hong Kong. After a long decades, fortunately, in 2011, the 5th Miss Nepal Hong Kong was held on 3 August 2011. Miss Hong Kong Nepal 2016 is going to be held on 16 September 2016 after three years. 14 contestants have been confirmed.

Miss Nepal Oceania

Miss UK Nepal

Overseas Performance in Miss Nepal
The following is a list of overseas contestants who have competed at the Miss Nepal Pageant. Overseas competed from 2005 onwards, every year except 2007.

Score table

See also 
 List of Miss Nepal titleholders
 Miss Teen Nepal
 Miss Universe Nepal

References

External links
 Miss Nepal 2015
 Miss Nepal Official Website

 
 
 

 
Nepal
Beauty pageants in Nepal
Nepalese awards
Recurring events established in 1994